MIL-STD-129 standard is used for maintaining uniformity while marking military equipment and supplies that are transported through ships. This standard has been approved to be used by the United States Department of Defense and all other government agencies. Items must be marked for easy identification before they are transported. The marking helps the military personnel to fill the necessary requisition, when a particular stock goes short of the balance level.

Container Categories 
Shipping containers carrying military items can be categorized into 3 types namely Unit Containers, Intermediate Containers and Exterior Containers as per the requirement standard of MIL-STD-129. However, for all type of containers the basic format such as National Stock Number (NSN), item description and part number are mandatory. For Exterior containers certain additional labels like Military Shipment Label(MSL), serial number barcode and Direct-Vendor Delivery label(DVD) are required.

Change Notice 4 
Major changes to Mil-Std-129 came with Revision P's Change Notice 4, known as MIL-STD-129P(4), released on 19 September 2007. There is amendment for exterior containers in this new MIL-STD-129P (4) standard. Now onwards along with the earlier NSN, Contract and CAGE, two new bar codes namely The Contract Line Item (CLIN) and Shipment Numbers (SN) are mandatory for exterior containers.  Two-dimensional PDF417 bar code symbols were introduced to identify UID-marked contents.

Highlights of Change Notice 4 
 Serial numbers are assigned in "SER NO" format. 
 The description of items should be exactly as per the contract.
 There should be spaces or dashes in NSN.
 Barcode information is also required. For shipments that include UII items, a single two-dimensional barcode (PDF417) is required. For shipments that do not include UII items, the barcodes should be (MIL-STD-129, para 4.4.1.2):
 NSN/NATO stock number (without dashes, spaces, prefix or suffix unless other specified in contract), if one is assigned
 Contract or Order Number
 CAGE of the Prime Contractor
 CLIN (when used)
 Contract Shipment Number
 Serial Number(s)

Revision R 
Revision R to Mil-Std-129 went into effect February 18, 2014.   A primary focus of the revision was the use of two-dimensional PDF417 bar code symbols to replace linear bar codes on all container identification labels.  The use of PDF417 symbols on container labels was introduced in Change Notice 4 to facilitate the demands of Unique Identification (UID) markings, which at up to fifty characters in length are too long to be represented with traditional Code39 linear bar codes.

Prior to Revision R, a container label would require up to ten linear bar codes for NSN, Contract, CLIN, CAGE, shipment number and up to five serial numbers.  The PDF417 is a very dense machine-readable symbol that may easily contain the data of those barcodes, plus five full-length IUIDs (Item Unique Identifiers).

While this change has reduced the number of labels required, there are other benefits to both vendors and the DOD.  For the DOD, the use of the PDF417 allows the depots to read the labels with automated data collection systems, which is virtually impossible with the linear barcodes due to the lack of data identifiers. Defense contractors can benefit from this same capability in their own warehouse systems.

See also
 MIL STD 130
 MIL-STD-130N
 UID Compliance
 UID-marking

References

External links
 MIL-STD-129

Military of the United States standards
Procurement
Unique identifiers